The Fao Landing occurred from November 6, 1914 to November 8, 1914 with British forces attacking the Ottoman stronghold of Fao and its fortress. The landing was met with little resistance from the Turkish defenders who fled after intense shelling. It was the first military operation of the Mesopotamian Campaign of World War I which was carried out to protect the British Empire's oil supplies in the Persian Gulf.

Background 
When the Ottoman Empire entered into World War I, the British feared for the safety of the Persian Gulf oil facilities. To protect their facilities, the British decided to capture the Ottoman-controlled section of the Persian Gulf coast. The Fortress of Fao was the main Ottoman fortress on the Persian Gulf coast and to Anglo commanders seemed like the logical jumping off point for any Ottoman attack on British oil facilities. The British assigned Indian Expeditionary Force D (IEF D) which consisted of the 6th (Poona) Division led by Lieutenant General Arthur Barrett, with Sir Percy Cox as Political Officer.

Landing 
The British sloop HMS Odin shelled the Turkish positions near the old fortress of Fao, silencing the enemy batteries and clearing the way for the landing force. A six-hundred strong force came ashore in the shallow, muddy waters with two mountain guns in tow and faced little resistance. The combined British and Indian force captured the poorly prepared Ottoman positions swiftly, seizing a large amount of largely undamaged material including several artillery guns, many of them still in position and loaded. Evidently, the weak Ottoman garrison was abandoned by its soldiers when the fort commander known as the "Bimbashi of Fao Fort" was killed by a shell.

Aftermath 
The landing and capture of Fao was a strategic blunder for the Ottomans from which they would never truly recover as evidenced by the subsequent string of defeats suffered by the Empire at the hands of the British in the following year. The Ottomans also no longer controlled a key access point to the Persian Gulf, and the British facilities were largely safe. However, the British felt that their facilities would not be truly safe until they managed to capture Baghdad. This led to several campaigns against Baghdad that would result in the capture of that city by the British in 1917.

In popular culture 
The Fao Landing and the subsequent battle for the fortress are featured in the video game Battlefield 1.

References 

 Wilson, Sir Arnold. Loyalties Mesopotamia 1914-1917. London: Oxford University Press, 1930.
 Barker A.J. The Iraq War. Enigma Books, 2009.

1914 in Ottoman Iraq
Battles of the Mesopotamian campaign
Battles of World War I involving the Ottoman Empire
Battles of World War I involving the United Kingdom
Battles of World War I involving British India
Conflicts in 1914
November 1914 events
Landing operations